The West Side Highway is a major road in New York City.

West Side Highway may also refer to:
 West Side Elevated Highway, a former elevated highway in New York City
 West Side Highway, Washington, an unincorporated place in Cowlitz County, Washington, US
 West Side Highway (Oregon) or Oregon Route 99W
 The segment of California State Route 33 in the San Joaquin Valley
 West Side Freeway, a segment of Interstate 5 in California's San Joaquin Valley, known as West Side Highway (California).
 West Side Highway (EP), the second eponymously titled extended play by the American punk rock band Pinhead Gunpowder